Paul Edward Kearse (February 23, 1916 – July 15, 1968) was an American professional baseball player. In 11 career games, he had 5 hits in 26 at-bats. He batted and threw right-handed.

Kearse was born in San Francisco, California, and died in Eureka, California.

External links

1916 births
1968 deaths
New York Yankees players
Major League Baseball catchers
Baseball players from San Francisco
Rogers Lions players
Fort Worth Cats players
Grand Forks Chiefs players
Joplin Miners players
Kansas City Blues (baseball) players
Oakland Oaks (baseball) players
Paducah Chiefs players
Seattle Rainiers players
Ventura Yankees players
Wenatchee Chiefs players